The 2008 Southern Illinois Salukis football team represented Southern Illinois University as a member of the Missouri Valley Football Conference (MVFC) during the 2008 NCAA Division I FCS football season. They were led by first-year head coach Dale Lennon and played their home games at McAndrew Stadium in Carbondale, Illinois. The Salukis finished the season with a 9–3 record overall and a 7–1 mark in conference play, sharing the MVFC title with Northern Iowa. The team received an automatic bid to the FCS playoffs, where they lost to New Hampshire in the first round. Southern Illinois was ranked No. 11 in The Sports Network's postseason ranking of FCS teams.

Schedule

References

Southern Illinois
Southern Illinois Salukis football seasons
Missouri Valley Football Conference champion seasons
Southern Illinois Salukis football